Leonard William Benvenuti (born October 10, 1959) and Stephen Mark Rudnick (born February 24, 1958) are a Chicago-based film and television writing and producing team. The two met in 1978 while studying with Josephine Forsberg at The Players Workshop of Second City.
In 1990, they developed their own late-night variety show called The Steve and Leo Show.

Benvenuti and Rudnick  also created and co-executive produced NBC's TV series "The Second Half" and the short-lived 1998 Fox TV series Damon, starring Damon Wayans.

They have written several films, including The Santa Clause, Space Jam, and Kicking & Screaming.

Filmography

Writers
 The Carol Burnett Show (1991)
 Tom Arnold: The Naked Truth 2 (1992)
 The Dennis Miller Show (1992)
 The Rosey and Buddy Show (1992)
 Tom Arnold: The Naked Truth 3 (1993)
 The Second Half (1993) (5 episodes)
 The Santa Clause (1994)
 Space Jam (1996)
 Damon (1998) (also creators)
 Kicking & Screaming (2005)
 The Jeff Garlin Program (2006)
Are We There Yet? (2012)
 Mayfly (2013)

Benvenuti only

 Kill the Messenger (2000)

Rudnick only
 My Guide to Becoming a Rockstar (2002)

Producers
 The Second Half (1993) (co-executive producers)
 Damon (1998) (executive producers)
 The Jeff Garlin Program (2006) executive producers)

Directors
 Cop Show (2007) (short)

Rudnick as an actor
 I'm Here. Where R U (2011)

References

External links

American male screenwriters
American television producers
American television writers
Screenwriting duos
Living people
1958 births
1959 births
American male television writers